Celena Shafer is an American soprano, born c. 1975 in Centerville, Utah.

Career
At age 17, Shafer won a vocal competition at the Utah State Fair, and was selected to sing with the Utah Symphony orchestra in their Salute to Youth concert.  After graduating from Viewmont High School, she enrolled in the University of Utah, where she continued her vocal study.  After graduation, she enrolled in the Santa Fe opera apprentice program, further developing her coloratura skills in roles as Marie (La Fille du Régiment) and Gilda (Rigoletto).

In 1999, Shafer won the Metropolitan Opera National Council of Auditions, Utah district.  She is also the recipient of a 2000 Sara Tucker Study Grant from the Richard Tucker Foundation.

After a performance in Mozart's Mitridate, re di Ponto singing the role of Princess Ismene with the Santa Fe Opera in the summer of 2001, Shafer was the recipient of the 2002 Recognizing Individual Artistry Award, an honor given annually by the Thomas Foundation.  The same year, she sang the role of Aithra in the New York concert performance of  Strauss' Die ägyptische Helena, alongside Deborah Voigt, who had the title role.  This performance was later released on CD.

During the 2004–05 season, she debuted with the New York Philharmonic in a performance of Handel's Messiah. In April 2005, she sang the title role of Esclarmonde at the Washington Concert Opera.

Other roles include Tytania in A Midsummer Night's Dream, Nanetta in Falstaff, Hero in Berlioz's Beatrice and Benedict, Zerbinetta in a concert performance of Ariadne auf Naxos, Blonde in The Abduction from the Seraglio, Adele in Die Fledermaus, and Show Boat for a gala benefit for Carnegie Hall.

References
Biography on Celena Shafer at Colbert Artists Management Inc.
Continuum article on Celena Shafer
New York Philharmonic and Celena Shafer

1970s births
American operatic sopranos
People from Centerville, Utah
University of Utah alumni
Living people
21st-century American women opera singers
Singers from Utah
Classical musicians from Utah